Storz is a type of hose coupling invented by Carl August Guido Storz in 1882 and patented in Switzerland in 1890, and patented in the U.S. in 1893 that connects using interlocking hooks and flanges. It was first specified in standard FEN 301-316, and has been used by German fire brigades since 1933. (See German delivery hose article.) Amongst other uses, it has been widely employed on fire hoses in firefighting applications. It is the standard coupling on fire hoses in Portugal, Denmark, Slovenia, Germany, Austria, Switzerland, Sweden, the Netherlands, Poland, Israel, Croatia, Serbia, Bosnia & Herzegovina, Macedonia, Montenegro and Greece.  It is also one of the standard couplings on fire hoses in Australia and the United States.

The Storz coupling system is also widely used for filling of bulk wood pellet storage systems in Europe (Storz-A or  size), although in France and Belgium the equivalent Guillemin coupling is more commonly employed.

Storz connectors are usually made of brass or aluminium. They can be manufactured by casting for general hose connection and low pressure applications, but for firefighting, it is better to use forgings to guarantee the safety and durability of the coupling.

It is sometimes referred to as a sexless coupling, because rather than having a male and a female end connected by screw threads, either identical end can be joined to any other end of the same diameter. This is also called hermaphroditic or two-way connection. To couple a Storz connection, the two opposing couplings are pressed together such that the hooks of each one are inserted into the slots in the flange of the other. Then they are rotated in opposite directions until they are tight, or latches engage. This creates a watertight connection between the internal packing gaskets.  To uncouple them, the latches are released and the connectors are turned in the opposite directions from coupling, and then separated when the hooks and slots are aligned. Special wrenches are designed for assisting with use of Storz connectors.

The main benefit to using Storz couplings is speed of hose connection, as a hose can be locked with a quarter-turn. By comparison, locking hoses using threaded couplings often takes several turns. Because of this, Storz couplings are widely viewed as a safer alternative to using threaded couplings. A secondary benefit over threaded couplings is that the connecting faces and hooks are less prone to damage if the coupling is dropped onto, or dragged over, a hard surface.

Storz couplers are available commercially in the following non-DIN-specified sizes:

DIN standards define the following pressure couplings:

DIN standards define the following suction couplings:

DIN standards define the following fixed couplings (for securing fittings to hoses):

DIN standards define the following threaded adapters:

DIN standards define the following caps:

DIN standards define the following swivel reducers:

United States usage

Storz rapidly became a standard for fire hydrants throughout much of Europe, but it took nearly one hundred years before the main larger "steamer ports" on fire hydrants started to be converted to the Storz coupling in the United States. U.S. fire engines typically carry LDH (large diameter hose) with Storz couplings on both ends for connections between fire hydrants and pumps. However, if a hydrant usually has threaded couplings, an adapter is required to use with Storz. All major U.S. hydrant manufacturers now offer Storz couplings as original equipment on their hydrants, to connect with the Storz couplings used by firefighters. Hydrants may also be retro-fitted from thread to Storz to aid interoperability between firefighting organizations.

The 100 mm (4-inch) and 125 mm (5-inch) Storz couplers have been specified in NFPA 1963, Standard for Fire Hose Connections, since the 1993 edition.

U.S. cities that have fire hydrants with 125 mm Storz connectors include Raleigh, NC and the City of Corvallis, OR (adapter on 4-inch threaded outlet).

The 150 mm (6-inch) size is occasionally used for PVC suction hose, in place of the industry-standard 6 NH threads.

See also 
 Bayonet mount
 Hose coupling

References

  The U.S. Patent Carl August Guido Storz was granted in 1893.
 AS2419.4: "Fire hydrant installations, Part 4: Storz connections for firefighting purposes" (2020)
 CAN-ULC-S543: "Standard for internal lug quick-connect couplings for fire hose" (2009)
 DIN 14330: "Aluminium alloy delivery coupling type C nominal pressure PN 16" (2012)
 DIN 14301: "Aluminium alloy delivery and suction coupling type D; nominal pressure" (1985)
 DIN 14302: "Aluminium alloy delivery coupling type C; nominal pressure 16" (1985)
 DIN 14303: "Aluminium alloy delivery coupling type B with nominal pressure PN 16" (2013)
 DIN 14323: "Aluminium alloy delivery and suction coupling type A; nominal pressure 16" (1985)
 DIN 14332: "Aluminium alloy delivery coupling type C; nominal pressure 16; used for fire hoses C 42" (1986)

Firefighting equipment